Mij in Iran may refer to:
 Mij, Fars
 Mij, Kerman
 Mij, Mazandaran